The FA Cup 1974–75 is the 94th season of the world's oldest football knockout competition; The Football Association Challenge Cup, or FA Cup for short. The large number of clubs entering the tournament from lower down the English football league system meant that the competition started with a number of preliminary and qualifying rounds. The 28 victorious teams from the Fourth Round Qualifying progressed to the First Round Proper.

Preliminary round

Ties

Replays

2nd replays

1st qualifying round

Ties

Replays

2nd replays

2nd qualifying round

Ties

Replays

2nd replay

3rd qualifying round

Ties

Replays

2nd replay

4th qualifying round
The teams that given byes to this round are Scarborough, Wigan Athletic, Walton & Hersham, Slough Town, Barnet, Hendon, Telford United, Hillingdon Borough, Yeovil Town, Gateshead United, Chelmsford City, Grantham, Margate, Bangor City, Boston United, Guildford & Dorking United, Blyth Spartans, Kettering Town, Hayes and Altrincham.

Ties

Replays

2nd replay

1974–75 FA Cup
See 1974-75 FA Cup for details of the rounds from the First Round Proper onwards.

External links
 Football Club History Database: FA Cup 1974–75
 FA Cup Past Results

Qualifying Rounds
FA Cup qualifying rounds